The 2002 Scheldeprijs was the 89th edition of the Scheldeprijs cycle race and was held on 24 April 2002. The race was won by Robbie McEwen of the Lotto team.

General classification

References

2002
2002 in road cycling
2002 in Belgian sport